Sukhdeo Prasad Verma is an Indian politician. He was elected to the lower House of the Indian Parliament the Lok Sabha from Nawada, Bihar and Chatra, Bihar.

References

Indian National Congress politicians
Janata Party politicians
India MPs 1971–1977
India MPs 1977–1979
Lok Sabha members from Bihar
Possibly living people
Year of birth missing